The Pseudochactidae are a scorpion family. They are predominantly found in caves.

Genera 
Aemngvantom  2012 
 Pseudochactas Gromov, 1998
 Troglokhammouanus

References 

 Gromov, A.V. 1998: A new family, genus and species of scorpions (Arachnida, Scorpiones) from southern Central Asia. Zoologicheskii zhurnal, 77(9): 1003-1008. [not seen, in Russian with English summary, English translation in Russian journal of zoology, 2: 409–413. (1998)]
 Lourenço, W.R.; Pham, D.-S. 2010: A remarkable new cave scorpion of the family Pseudochactidae Gromov (Chelicerata, Scorpiones) from Vietnam. ZooKeys, 71: 1–13.

External links 
 

 
Scorpion families
Taxa described in 1998